Jeungpyeon, also called sultteok, is a variety of tteok (rice cake) made by steaming rice flour dough prepared with makgeolli (rice wine).

Preparation 
Sieved non-glutinous rice flour is mixed with hot makgeolli (rice wine), covered, and left to swell up in a warm room. Risen dough is mixed again to draw out the air bubbles, covered, and let rise once more. It is then steamed in jeungpyeon mold, with toppings such as pine nuts, black sesame, julienned jujubes, julienned rock tripe, chrysanthemum petals, and cockscomb petals.

History 
Jeungpyeon is called by various names such as gijeungtteog, gijitteog, sultteog, beong-geojitteog.

References 

Foods with alcoholic drinks
Steamed foods
Tteok